Gehyra kimberleyi, also known commonly as the Kimberley dtella or the robust termitaria gecko, is a species of gecko, a lizard  in the family Gekkonidae. The species is endemic to western Australia.

Etymology
The specific name, kimberleyi, refers to the Kimberley region of Western Australia.

Geographic range
G. kimberleyi is found in the northwestern part of the state of Western Australia.

Habitat
The preferred habitat of G. kimberleyi is termite nests (termitaria).

Reproduction
G. kimberleyi is oviparous.

References

Further reading
Börner, Achim-Rüdiger; Schüttler, Brigette I. (1983). "An additional note on the Australian geckos of the genus Gehyra ". Miscellaneous Articles in Saurology 12: 1–4. (Gehyra kimberleyi, new species).
Oliver, Paul M.; Bourke, Gayleen; Pratt, Renae C.; Doughty, Paul; Moritz, Craig (2016). "Systematics of small Gehyra (Squamata: Gekkonidae) of the southern Kimberley, Western Australia: redescription of G. kimberleyi Börner & Schüttler, 1983 and description of a new restricted range species". Zootaxa 4107 (1): 049–064.

Gehyra
Reptiles described in 1982
Taxa named by Achim-Rüdiger Börner
Geckos of Australia